Victoria Nixon (born 7 June 1948) is a British author and company director. She was previously an international fashion model.

Early life 
Nixon was born in Barnsley, West Riding of Yorkshire, and educated at Barnsley Girls' High School. Her father owned a car dealership; her mother was a college bursar. She had an elder brother. At the age of 16, she caught the eye of Paul Jones, the lead singer of Manfred Mann, at a gig in Sheffield, and he said that she should go to London to be a model. After completing a secretarial course at the Northern Secretarial College in Leeds, she left for London.

Career

Modelling 
At the age of 18 she was spotted in London's Bond Street by top fashion photographer Helmut Newton who stepped out of a taxi and offered her a contract launching a decade-long international modelling career as Vikki Nixon in 1966. Subsequently, she appeared in French, English, Italian and American Vogue, Harpers Bazaar, Glamour, Nova, 19 and Elle.
She was selected as the Daily Mail's 'Face of 68',

She featured in a number of high-profile press advertising campaigns and was the first British model to work with a Milan model agency, Riccardo Gay.

Television 
As a result of her modelling career she also appeared on a number of TV programmes, most notably in the 1969 live coverage of the Apollo 11 moon landing where she appeared with presenter Cliff Michelmore and journalist Jean Rook during the live studio broadcast wearing a "space-fashion outfit". She was the first "promo star" of the BBC's 'Top of the Pops' described in Disc and Music Echo 11 April issue as an "Angelic looking Hell's Angel", and "girlfriend of promotion ace Bill Fowler." When a music act, such as Andy Williams or Kenny Rogers, was unable to appear live, producer/director Mel Cornish would pre-film a clip of her to broadcast with the song. She was featured in a 1975 version of the hugely successful and long running TV campaign for Cadbury's flake.

In Australia 
After modelling, Nixon relocated to Australia and became an advertising copywriter and was the Melbourne editor of POL magazine, an avant-garde fashion and lifestyle glossy, from 1978 to 1985. Whilst still in Australia she formed a film production company and produced 'The Price of Fame' television series for Central Television UK, however the series was never broadcast but it remains "in the can".

Business 
In 1992, Nixon opened the One Stop Fresh delicatessen in Fulham, South London which specialised in healthy lunchtime food. One Stop Fresh was the first deli in the UK to use eco-friendly packaging.

In 2006, with Michael Messenger, she co-founded the British company Aircell Structures Ltd which designs and manufactures unique humanitarian aid products for medical charities and aid agencies such as IFRC, British & German Red Cross, Marie Stopes International and Vision Salud.

Author 
Whilst running the deli her first book 'Supermodels' Beauty Secrets was published in 2002 with contributions from Jerry Hall, Kate Moss and many others leading models. Reprinted thirteen times, it has also been translated into several languages including Spanish, Hungarian and Latvian. It formed part of Victoria's Celebrity Inspiration in "Beauty Flash", Liz Dwyer (now at Image Magazine)'s weekly column in TV Now.

Nixon's follow-up book Supermodels' Diet Secrets, based on her experience both as a model and latterly as a deli owner, was published in 2004 and the Daily Express bought the rights to serialise it.

HEAD SHOT is Nixon's latest book, published in August 2019. A coming-of-age memoir revealing her extreme life as an International model whilst confronting the tragic deaths of her entire family. A double page feature in the Daily Mail (5 August 2019) and interviews on BB4's Saturday Live 11 August 2019 and ITV Calendar 20 August 2019 followed Head Shot's publication.

Books

References

External links 
 

Writers from Yorkshire
English female models
Living people
1948 births
21st-century British women writers
People from Barnsley
21st-century English women
21st-century English people